Fernando da Silva Cabrita  (1 May 1923 – 22 September 2014) was a Portuguese football forward and manager.

He amassed Primeira Liga totals of 295 games and 88 goals over the course of 14 seasons, in representation of Olhanense and Sporting da Covilhã. Subsequently, he went on to have a coaching career that lasted more than two decades, and included spells with Benfica and the Portugal national team.

Club career
Born in Lagos, Algarve, Cabrita played 14 of his 18 years as a senior in his country's top division, starting out at S.C. Olhanense. In the 1943–44 season, he scored a career-best 20 goals in only 18 games to help his team to the fifth position out of ten clubs. Cabrita also represented Angers SCO (France, second level), S.C. Covilhã and Portimonense S.C. before retiring in 1960 at the age of 37.

International career
He gained seven caps for Portugal in twelve years, making his debut on 11 March 1945 in a 2–2 friendly draw against Spain and netting his only goal in his next appearance, a 1–5 away loss to the same opponent for the 1950 FIFA World Cup qualifiers, on 2 April 1950.

Managerial career
Cabrita started working as a coach as he was still playing with Portimonense, in 1959. His first full-time stop at the professional level came during the 1967–68 campaign, when he acted as interim at S.L. Benfica and led the club to the national championship, before Otto Glória took over. In the Portuguese top flight he was also in charge of U.F.C.I. Tomar, S.C. Beira-Mar, Rio Ave FC, Académico de Viseu FC and F.C. Penafiel.

Cabrita served as Portugal's manager during nine matches starting in 1983, after the resignation of Glória. He led a technical commission with three other members – José Augusto, António Morais and Toni – and coached the national side to the semi-finals at UEFA Euro 1984, where they lost 2–3 to France in extra time.

Death
Cabrita died on 22 September 2014 due to respiratory failure, at the Hospital Beatriz Ângelo in Loures, Lisbon. He was 91 years old.

Honours
Raja Casablanca
Botola: 1988

Individual

Orders
 Commander of the Order of Prince Henry

References

External links

1923 births
People from Lagos, Portugal
2014 deaths
Portuguese footballers
Association football forwards
Primeira Liga players
S.C. Olhanense players
S.C. Covilhã players
Portimonense S.C. players
Ligue 2 players
Angers SCO players
Portugal international footballers
Portuguese expatriate footballers
Expatriate footballers in France
Portuguese expatriate sportspeople in France
Portuguese football managers
Primeira Liga managers
Portimonense S.C. managers
S.L. Benfica managers
U.F.C.I. Tomar managers
S.C. Beira-Mar managers
Rio Ave F.C. managers
Académico de Viseu F.C. managers
F.C. Penafiel managers
C.F. Estrela da Amadora managers
Raja CA managers
Portugal national football team managers
UEFA Euro 1984 managers
Portuguese expatriate football managers
Expatriate football managers in Morocco
Sportspeople from Faro District
Botola managers